Hazel Nell Dukes  (born 1932) is an American activist. She is the past national president of the National Association for the Advancement of Colored People (NAACP).

Life
Hazel Nell Dukes was born on March 17, 1932, in Montgomery, Alabama. Her parents were Edward and Alice Dukes, and she was an only child. She enrolled at Alabama State Teachers College in 1949 hoping to become a teacher; however, she moved to New York City with her parents in 1955 where she started school at Nassau Community College and majored in Business Administration. While living in Roslyn, on Long Island, she worked to combat discrimination in housing. She worked for President LBJ's "Head Start" program in the 1960s. And in 1966, she gained a position at the Nassau County Attorney's Office, becoming the first black American to do so. She eventually worked as a community organizer for the Nassau County Economic Opportunity Commission (EOC) where she taught children that were living in poverty. Dukes graduated from Adelphi University in 1978 with a bachelor's degree. She remained outspoken consistently throughout the Reagan and Bush presidencies during the 1980s and some of the 1990s. Dukes' main concerns were education reform and more advancement in civil rights. From 1989 to 1992, Hazel Nell Dukes served as the national president of the National Association for the Advancement of Colored People (NAACP). Dukes was also made president of the New York City Off-Track Betting Corporation (NYCOTB) in 1990, twenty-five years after she had been doing social work there.

In 1997, she pleaded guilty to attempted grand larceny, her admission was that she stole $13,000.00 from a disabled NYCOTB worker who had allowed her to manage the worker's credit union account while Dukes was a manager of that organization.

Recognition and public image 
Dukes has been recognized for her many years of commitment to justice and activism.  She received a Candace Award for Community Service from the National Coalition of 100 Black Women in 1990.  In 2017, the Women's Black Agenda presented her with its Economic and Business Award, as part of the Congressional Black Caucus Foundation's annual conference.  She was awarded the Empire State and Nation Builder Award by the New York State Association of Black and Puerto Rican Legislators, and was recognized by the New York State Senate in 2018.  In 2019, a plaque honoring Dukes was placed on 137th Street and Adam Clayton Boulevard in Harlem, by the Migdol Organization.

New York mayor Rudy Giuliani publicly condemned her management of NYCOTB, saying that the organization lost money under her leadership.

References

External links
Turnquests, Joshua.  "A Tribute to Hazel Nell Dukes." NAACP Connect. NAACP, 2014. Web. 29 Oct. 2014.

American anti-racism activists
NAACP activists
1932 births
Living people
2020 United States presidential electors
New York (state) Democrats